Initial t. is an EP by the Japanese noise rock band Melt Banana, released in 2009 on Init Records.

Track listing

Side A
 "Loop Nebula" – 2:37

Side B
 "Leeching" – 1:18
 "Jack and a Red Dog" – 1:32

2009 EPs
Melt-Banana albums